The page summarises the Australia national soccer team fixtures and results in 2011.

Summary
Australia competed in the Asian Cup for the second time and improved on their previous effort by making the final. An extra-time goal by Japan meant Australia were to finish in the runner-up position. The middle of the year was most made up of friendlies, the most notable of which saw Australia come from behind to defeat Germany. Qualifiers for the 2014 FIFA World Cup filled out the year and despite a slip up in Muscat, Australia were well on their way to the fourth round with four wins from five matches. Australia peaked at 19 on the FIFA rankings during 2011.

Record

Match results

Friendlies

Asian Cup

World Cup qualifiers

Goal scorers

References

 Australia: Fixtures and Results
 Australia v New Zealand

2011 in Australian soccer
2011
Australia